The Komati River, also known as the  Inkomati River  or Incomati River (in Mozambique, from Portuguese Rio Incomati), is a river in South Africa, Eswatini and Mozambique.

Its mean annual discharge is 111 m3/s (3,920 cfs) at its mouth.

The name Komati is derived from inkomati, meaning "cow" in siSwati, as its perennial nature is compared to a cow that always has milk.

Geography 

The river originates west of Carolina, rising at an elevation of about  near Breyten in the Ermelo district of the Mpumalanga province.

The Komati Gorge is situated in the upper reaches of the Komati River and is the habitat of some endangered species such as the southern bald ibis.  In 2001 the 115 m high wall of the Maguga Dam was completed south of Piggs Peak, Eswatini, 

In its upper valley near Steynsdorp are goldfields, but the reefs consist almost entirely of low grade ore. Just west of 32° E and 25° 25′ S, near the town of Komatipoort, it is joined by the Crocodile River. The Crocodile tributary rises, as the Elands River, in the Bergendal (1,961 m) near the upper waters of the Komati, and flows eastwards across the highveld, being turned northward as it reaches the Drakensberg escarpment.

Just over a kilometre below the junction of the Crocodile, the united stream, which from this point is also known as the Manhissa, passes to the coastal plain through a 190 m high cleft, high in the Lebombo known as Komatipoort, featuring some picturesque falls. In flood time there is a connection northward through the swamps with the basin of the Limpopo. It is navigable from its mouth, where the water is up to 5m deep, to the foot of the Lebombo.

History 

The Portuguese named the river's lower reaches the Rio des Reijs, either "river of rice" or "river of kings". Subsequently, Jan van Riebeeck's journal mentions a Rio de Reijs, when he dispatched a ship up the east coast in search of rice supplies. In voortrekker Louis Tregardt's journal it is referred to as the Manhissa, a name still extant, while to the British it was known as the King George River.

In 1725 a Dutch expedition led by Francois de Kuiper explored the region of the lower Komati and travelled 30 km into the current Mpumalanga province, before they were attacked by local tribes and had to return to Delagoa Bay.

On the September 23, 1900 during the Second Boer War, 3,000 Boers crossed the frontier at the small town of Komati Poort, and surrendered to the Portuguese authorities.

On November 7, 1900 the banks of the Komati became the site of a battle between the British Empire and the Boers. The Battle of Leliefontein was a retreat by the British, harassed by the Boers, who were threatening to capture the British Artillery. The British guns were saved by the Royal Canadian Dragoons who charged the Boers, whereby they placed the guns out of their reach.

Railway 

The railway from Maputo to Pretoria traverses the plain in a direct line, and at seventy-two kilometres, reaches the Komati. It follows the south bank of the river and enters the high country at Komati Poort. From the Poort westward the railway skirts the south bank of the Crocodile River throughout its length. This railway was originally constructed by the Netherlands-South African Railway Company (NZASM) and was officially inaugurated in 1895.

See also 
 Komatiite
 Komatipoort
 List of rivers of South Africa

References

External links 
 The Maguga Dam Project
Key rivers of South Africa
 ECOSTATUS OF THE KOMATI RIVER CATCHMENT, INKOMATI RIVER SYSTEM

 
Rivers of Eswatini
Rivers of Mozambique
International rivers of Africa
Geography of Maputo Province
Rivers of Mpumalanga